Chisanda "Kent Green" Mutti (14 February 1957 — late 1990s) was a Zambian professional boxer of the 1970s and 1980s who won the Zambia middleweight title, Zambia light heavyweight title, and Commonwealth cruiserweight title, and was a challenger for the Commonwealth middleweight title against Tony Sibson, Commonwealth light heavyweight title against Lottie Mwale, African Boxing Union light heavyweight title against Lottie Mwale, and International Boxing Federation (IBF) cruiserweight title against Lee Roy Murphy, and Rickey Parkey, his professional fighting weight varied from , i.e. middleweight to , i.e. heavyweight.

References

External links

1957 births
1990s deaths
Cruiserweight boxers
Heavyweight boxers
Light-heavyweight boxers
Middleweight boxers
Sportspeople from Lusaka
Place of death missing
Zambian male boxers